João Pedro Mingote Ribeiro (born 2 August 1980), known as Mingote, is a Portuguese former footballer who played as a goalkeeper.

Club career
Born in Santa Maria da Feira, Aveiro District, Mingote's professional input in his homeland consisted of 66 Segunda Liga games over the course of five seasons, with Associação Naval 1º de Maio and A.D. Ovarense. In 2004–05, he played understudy to Sérgio Leite as the latter club finished in 12th position.

During the 2008 January transfer window, Mingote left for Romania – where he would remain the following decade – and signed with CS Pandurii Târgu Jiu from lower league side A.D. Lousada. In the 2012–13 campaign, he contributed with 26 games to help the former team to a best-ever second place in Liga I.

Mingote left the Stadionul Municipal in the summer of 2016, going on to represent ASA 2013 Târgu Mureș and CS Universitatea Craiova.

References

External links

1980 births
Sportspeople from Santa Maria da Feira
Living people
Portuguese footballers
Association football goalkeepers
Liga Portugal 2 players
Segunda Divisão players
U.D. Leiria players
Associação Naval 1º de Maio players
A.D. Ovarense players
S.C. Dragões Sandinenses players
Moreirense F.C. players
A.D. Lousada players
Liga I players
CS Pandurii Târgu Jiu players
ASA 2013 Târgu Mureș players
CS Universitatea Craiova players
ASC Daco-Getica București players
Portugal youth international footballers
Portuguese expatriate footballers
Expatriate footballers in Romania
Portuguese expatriate sportspeople in Romania